Glossobalanus is a genus of worms belonging to the family Ptychoderidae.

The genus has almost cosmopolitan distribution.

Species

Species:

Glossobalanus alatus 
Glossobalanus barnharti 
Glossobalanus berkeleyi

References

Enteropneusta